Malibu Nights is the second studio album by American indie pop band LANY. It was released on October 5, 2018, by Side Street Entertainment and Polydor Records. The album was produced by Mike Crossey.

The album was promoted by four singles with one promotional single, including the ballad lead single "Thru These Tears".

Writing and recording
Malibu Nights was written and recorded in early 2018 following the end of a romantic relationship frontman Paul Jason Klein was having with English singer Dua Lipa. Klein says he wrote music as a form of catharsis without the idea of an album in mind but realized after "50 days" that he had written the band's second album. Klein later stated he was thankful for experiencing heartbreak as it allowed him a productive and therapeutic outlet.

The album was originally planned to be called January but was renamed to be more universal.

Music
The album's sound was characterised as "airy, treacly and catchy" by Bandwagon Asia. Billboard called it the band's "most vulnerable work to date" and a set of "nine lush pop songs". The lead single "Thru These Tears" was called a "somber exploration of lost love" and "a song about finding the hope in sorrow". Second single "I Don't Wanna Love You Anymore" details the "anguish and heartache felt after a lover unexpectedly leaves frontman and lead vocalist Paul Jason Klein", with the pre-chorus: "Sick of staring up at the ceiling. How'd you change your mind just like that? The only way to get past this feeling, is to tell myself you're not coming back".

Along with lyrics about "love, longing and loss in the wake of heartbreak", the album incorporates more guitar, piano and drums than their self-titled debut. The album's title track is based around a piano instrumental.

Promotion
The album was announced in an Instagram post in March 2018, and later promoted with a performance of lead single "Thru These Tears" on The Late Late Show with James Corden in August 2018.

Track listing

Personnel
 Paul Klein – lead vocals, guitars, piano
 Les Priest
 Jake Goss – drums

Charts

References

2018 albums
LANY albums
Polydor Records albums